Somatina rosacea is a moth of the family Geometridae first described by Charles Swinhoe in 1894. It is found in northeast India's Khasi Hills and in Taiwan.

Subspecies
Somatina rosacea rosacea (India)
Somatina rosacea anaemica Prout, 1914 (Taiwan)

References

Moths described in 1894
Scopulini